Rolling Papers may refer to:

 Rolling paper, small sheets, rolls, or leaves of paper which are sold for rolling one's own cigarettes
 Rolling Papers (album), the debut studio album of Wiz Khalifa
 Rolling Papers (mixtape), the debut mixtape of Domo Genesis
 Rolling Papers (film), a 2015 documentary about The Denver Post's coverage of newly legal recreational marijuana